A sticker album is a book in which collectable stickers are stuck into designated sections. Sticker album themes can be sporting events such as the FIFA World Cup, English Premier League or TV shows, Movies, Animals or Music. Panini were the first company to release a collectable football sticker doing so in 1961, but coming more prominent with their release of the 1970 World Cup album. Merlin Publishing and Topps also notably mass produced sticker albums of a variety of different subjects.

History
Panini first produced a World Cup sticker album for the 1970 World Cup in Mexico. Initiating a craze for collecting and trading stickers, UK newspaper The Guardian states, "the tradition of swapping duplicate [World Cup] stickers was a playground fixture during the 1970s and 1980s." A complete 1970 World Cup sticker album signed by Pelé sold for a record £10,450.

The stickers are usually sold in blind packs, so the purchaser does not know which stickers they are buying. Collectors then swap or sell their spares with other collectors. When perusing a fellow collector's stickers in order to determine which stickers are of interest, it is usual practice for the prospective recipient to sort through the stack of stickers quickly in their hands, and place them into 2 piles (those of interest, and those which they already possess). Protocol dictates that the sorter must state out loud either "got it" or "need it" as they assess each sticker in turn.

Layout

Sports

A sports-related sticker album, such as Panini's FIFA World Cup edition, have designated sections for each team along with numbered rectangles for each sticker. Each sticker will have the player's picture and below it there is usually their name, birth date, position and birthplace. In addition to the players, there are stickers which bear the team's crest and a team photo. Under its Merlin brand, since 1994 Topps has held the licence to produce a sticker album for the Premier League, which is the best selling annual collectable for boys in the UK. According to the Panini Group, the 2010 FIFA World Cup album sold 10 million packs in the U.S. alone.

Digital sticker album
In May 2006, Panini partnered with The Coca-Cola Company and Tokenzone to produce the first virtual sticker album for the 2006 FIFA World Cup. For the 2014 FIFA World Cup, three million FIFA.com users took part in the Panini Digital Sticker Album contest. Panini developed an app for the 2018 FIFA World Cup where fans could collect and swap virtual stickers. Five million people gathered digital stickers for the 2018 World Cup.

See also
Association football trading card
Coupon collector's problem
Panini Group
Merlin Publishing

References

Association football culture
Books by type
Memorabilia
Album